Common Thread is a studio album released by the country/gospel group The Oak Ridge Boys. The album was released on May 24, 2005.

Track listing

"Jesus Is Coming Soon" (R.E. Winsett) - 2:42 *
"He Did It All for Me" (Duane Allen, Powell Sager) - 2:42 #
"You Can't Fix It" (Chaz Bosarge, Neil Johnson, Phil Johnson) - 3:54 #
"I Know" (Morrey Burns, Lois Mann, Ervin T. Rouse, Laverne Tripp) - 3:08 #
"The Journey" (Joe Bonsall) - 5:29 ^
"How Great Thou Art" (Stuart K. Hine) - 3:02 *
"This Little Light of Mine" (Traditional) - 4:40 *
"You Don't Have to Go Home (But You Can't Stay Here)" (Larry Cordle, Jerry Salley, Larry Shell) - 3:09 ^
"Amazing Grace" (John Newton) - 3:08 *
"I Saw the Light" (Hank Williams) - 3:13 *
"Keep Our World Safe" (Norah Lee Allen) - 3:25 #
"God Will Take Care of You" - 3:31 *

Production

Common Thread is a collection of songs from various sources:

 Six of the songs (*) were originally released in 2004 as part of a special edition of From The Heart, made available exclusively through Feed The Children. 
 Two of the songs (^) were originally released in 2004 on the album The Journey.
 The remaining four tracks (#) were recorded specifically for this album

Awards

On 2006, Common Thread was nominated for a Dove Award for Southern Gospel Album of the Year at the 37th GMA Dove Awards.

References

External links
Common Thread at Amazon.com

2005 albums
The Oak Ridge Boys albums